Allen Buchanan (December 22, 1876 – January 12, 1940) was an officer in the United States Navy and a Medal of Honor recipient for his role in the United States occupation of Veracruz.

He died January 12, 1940, and is buried with his wife Mary Goodwin (1876–1952) in Arlington National Cemetery, Arlington, Virginia.

Medal of Honor citation
Rank and organization: Lieutenant Commander, U.S. Navy. Born: 22 December 1876, Evansville, Ind. Accredited to: Indiana. G.O. No.: 177, 4 December 1915. Other Navy award: Navy Cross.

Citation:

For distinguished conduct in battle, engagements of Vera Cruz, 21 and 22 April 1914. In command of the 1st Seaman Regiment, Lt. Cmdr. Buchanan was in both days' fighting and almost continually under fire from soon after landing, about noon of the 21st, until we were in possession of the city, about noon of the 22d. His duties required him to be at points of great danger in directing his officers and men, and he exhibited conspicuous courage, coolness, and skill in his conduct of the fighting. Upon his courage and skill depended, in great measure, success or Failure. His responsibilities were great, and he met them in a manner worthy of commendation.

Navy Cross citation
Citation:

The Navy Cross is awarded to Commander Allen Buchanan, U.S. Navy, for distinguished service in the line of his profession as commanding officer of the U.S.S. Downes, engaged in the important, exacting and hazardous duty of patrolling the waters infested with enemy submarines and mines, in escorting and protecting vitally important convoys of troops and supplies through these waters, and in offensive and defensive action, vigorously and unremittingly prosecuted against all forms of enemy naval activity.

See also

 List of Medal of Honor recipients (Veracruz)

References

External links
 

 US People: Captain Allen Buchanan (1876–1940)

1876 births
1940 deaths
United States Navy Medal of Honor recipients
Recipients of the Navy Cross (United States)
United States Navy officers
Burials at Arlington National Cemetery
People from Evansville, Indiana
Battle of Veracruz (1914) recipients of the Medal of Honor
United States Navy personnel of World War I